Téméraire was a 74-gun ship of the line of the French Navy, ordered in December 1747 to a design by François Coulomb, and built at Toulon by his cousin, the constructor Pierre-Blaise Coulomb; she was launched on 24 December 1749. Her 74 guns comprised:28 x 36-pounders on the lower deck30 x 18-pounders on the upper deck 10 x 8-pounders on the quarterdeck6 x 8-pounders on the forecastle.

 under Admiral Boscawen captured Téméraire at the Battle of Lagos on 18 August 1759. She was thus taken into the Royal Navy and recommissioned as the Third Rate 'HMS Temeraire.

By 1780 she was used as a floating battery used to protect the harbour at Plymouth. She was sold in 1783.

See also
List of ships captured in the 18th century

FateTemeraire was sold out of the navy in 1784.

Notes

References

Lavery, Brian (2003) The Ship of the Line - Volume 1: The development of the battlefleet 1650-1850. Conway Maritime Press. .
Winfield, Rif and Roberts, Stephen S., French Warships in the Age of Sail 1626-1786: Design, Construction, Careers and Fates''. (Seaforth Publishing, 2017) .

Temeraire (1749)
Ships of the line of the Royal Navy
1749 ships
Captured ships